An outpost is a square on the fourth, fifth, sixth, or seventh  which is protected by a pawn and which cannot be attacked by an opponent's pawn.  Such a square is a hole for the opponent . In the figure to the right, c4 is an outpost, occupied by White's knight.  It cannot be attacked by Black's pawns – there is no pawn on the d- and Black's pawn on the b-file is too far advanced.

Outposts are a favourable position from which one can launch an attack, particularly using a knight. An outpost is even more effective where it is difficult to trade off with an equal valued piece, e.g., if the opponent only has a bishop of the opposite color to the outpost square's color. 

Knights are most efficient when they are close to the enemy's stronghold. This is because of their short reach, something not true of bishops, rooks and queens. They are also more effective in the centre of the board than on the edges. Therefore, the ideal to be aimed at is an outpost in one of the central (c-, d-, e- or f-) files in an advanced position (e.g. the sixth rank) with a knight. Knowledge of outposts and their effectiveness is crucial in exploiting situations involving an isolated queen's pawn.

On the other hand, Nimzowitsch argued when the outpost is in one of the flank (a-, b-, g- and h-) files the ideal piece to make use of the outpost is a rook. This is because the rook can put pressure on all the squares along the rank.

References

Bibliography
 

Chess terminology
Chess strategy